The 2012 Colgate Raiders football team represented Colgate University in the 2012 NCAA Division I FCS football season. They were led by 17th-year head coach Dick Biddle and played their home games at Andy Kerr Stadium. They were a member of the Patriot League. They finished the season 8–4, 6–0 in Patriot League play to be crowned Patriot League champions. They earned the League's automatic bid into the FCS playoffs where they lost in the first round to Wagner.

Schedule

Source: Schedule

References

Colgate
Colgate Raiders football seasons
Patriot League football champion seasons
Colgate
Colgate Raiders football